MAMI can mean:
 MAMI Moscow State Technical University
 Mumbai Academy of the Moving Image
 the Mainz Microtron particle accelerator, also known as MAMI